Verlet may refer to:

 Alice Verlet (1873–1934), Belgian-born operatic coloratura soprano
 Blandine Verlet (1942–2018), French harpsichordist
 Loup Verlet (born 1931), French physicist
 Raoul Verlet (1857–1923), French sculptor
 Verlet integration, a technique for computer simulation of molecular dynamics developed by Loup Verlet
 Verlet list, a data structure useful in computer simulations of systems of particles